Vedurupaka is a village in Rayavaram mandal, East Godavari district of Andhra Pradesh state, India.

Geography
The Tulyabhaga river flows by Vedurupaka. William Wilson Hunter described it as one of the seven estuaries of the mighty Godavari River.

Culture
One of the main attractions is Vijaya Durga Peetham, a place of worship of the Hindu goddess Durga.  The village festival of Poleramma Jathara or Sambaram takes place each May; it is a 2-day carnival of religious fervour and traditional dances. This event was supervised by the late Sri Murthineedi Venkayya Garu for 40 years.  Another festival is Dasara.

The village's Hindu temples were built by the  king of Peddapuram Thimma gaja pathi maharaja in 1700 AD.

Education
The first school in Vedurupaka was established by the Canadian Baptist Mission, one of the early Christian mission initiatives. It was later gifted to the Government. This village has three Government Primary Schools along with SPPR Zilla Parishath High School.

Brahmin Student financial support trust originated in this village. D Satya Prasad, Brahmanaseva trust, Vedurupaka, Rayavaram Mandalam.

Notables
Sri Vijaya Durga Peethathipati, a Vedic Exegete
Reverend Professor G. Babu Rao, the first graduate of Vedurupaka, who taught Old Testament at the country's first University, the Senate of Serampore College (University) in Serampore, West Bengal
Katcha George Victor, Ex-Member of the Andhra Pradesh Legislative Council
G. Satyamurthy, teacher  and member of the United Teachers Federation who later became a film writer, director and lyricist
Gara Chitti Babu of the United Teachers Federation,
S. Chandra Sekhar Reddy - Tollywood film director
Vasu Varma - Tollywood film director
Devi Sri Prasad (music director)
Gandham Sagar (playback singer, TV host)

References 

Villages in East Godavari district